Cowansville is an unincorporated community in Armstrong County, Pennsylvania, United States. Cowansville has a post office, with ZIP code 16218, which opened on August 8, 1849.

History
Middlesex, Cowansville P.O., appears in the 1876 Atlas of Armstrong County, Pennsylvania.

Notes

Unincorporated communities in Armstrong County, Pennsylvania
Unincorporated communities in Pennsylvania
1849 establishments in Pennsylvania